Palamabron is a character in William Blake's mythology, representing pity. He is the brother of Rintrah (wrath), Bromion (scientific thought) and Theotormon (desire/jealousy), represented together as either the Sons of Los or of Jerusalem.

William Blake's mythology